Phenylobacterium hankyongense is a Gram negative, non-spore-forming, rod-shaped, aerobic and non-motile bacterium from the genus of Phenylobacterium which has been isolated from soil from a ginseng field.

References

Caulobacterales
Bacteria described in 2018